Thomson Dam, also known as the Thomson Hydro Station or Thomson Water Project, is an embankment and concrete gravity dam on the Saint Louis River near the town of Thomson in northeastern Minnesota, United States. It consists of a 1600-foot (488 m) long primary structure and multiple supplementary dams which, together with precambrian rock outcrops known as the Thomson formation, impound the river to create Thomson Reservoir.

The tallest dam in the complex is 51.6 feet (16 m) and the longest is 3500 feet (1067 m). A series of gate houses, a canal, forebay, and underground penstocks supply a hydropower plant located 3 miles away in Jay Cooke State Park. With an installed capacity of 72 MW and an annual generation of approximately 280 GWh, the Thomson project is the largest hydroelectric facility in the state.

History 
Thomson Dam was completed in 1907 by Great Northern Power, an operating division of the Great Northern Railway. The generating station was expanded in 1914 with the addition of Unit 4. Unit 5 was added in 1918 and Unit 6 in 1948. Railroad tracks built into the generator floor allowed for installation and maintenance of the equipment. The complex was later transferred to the Saint Louis Power Company. Today it is owned by Minnesota Power, a division of Allete, Inc.

Heavy rains in June 2012 created an historic flood in the region which overtopped the dam, breached the forebay canal and severely damaged the hydroelectric station. Following $90 million in reconstruction and upgrades, including the addition of a new emergency spillway, the facility came back online in November, 2014. Additional upgrades will continue through 2018, including removal of the original 46kV transmission line equipment in favor of other, higher voltage equipment that was added later.

Structures 
The most visible part of Thomson Dam is the primary structure straddling the Saint Louis River channel near Minnesota State Highway 210. However, the Thomson Project is actually composed of multiple dams and control structures, several of which have been rebuilt and merged over the years. Today the United States Army Corps of Engineers National Inventory of Dams (NID) counts 18 structures as part of the complex, with 14 formally listed as separate.

See also 
 List of dams and reservoirs in Minnesota

References 

Dams in Minnesota
Hydroelectric power plants in Minnesota
Buildings and structures in Carlton County, Minnesota
1907 establishments in Minnesota
Dams completed in 1907